Marce is a singer/songwriter.

Marce may also refer to:

 Marcé, French commune
 Typhoon Marce, used for several storms in the Philippines
 Marce et Tumpak, Martinican pop band that uses elements of both traditional and modern music

People
 Marce LaCouture, American folk music and cajun recording artist and songwriter
 Marce Rendic, Finnish radio personality